Daily Deal may refer to:

 Deal of the day (ecommerce)
 The Deal (magazine)